Peter III (10 February 1728  17 July 1762) was Emperor of Russia from 5 January 1762 until 9 July of the same year, when he was overthrown by his wife, Catherine II (the Great). He was born in the German city of Kiel as Charles Peter Ulrich of Schleswig-Holstein-Gottorp, but he was a grandson of Peter the Great and a great-grandson of Charles XI of Sweden.

Peter III could hardly speak Russian and pursued a strongly pro-Prussian policy, which made him an unpopular leader. The two countries were on opposing sides of the Seven Years' War, and Russian troops were threatening Berlin at the time of Peter's accession to the throne. He immediately switched sides in the war and withdrew his troops from Prussia, undoing hard-earned gains. He was deposed by troops loyal to his wife, Catherine, who, despite her own German origins, was a Russian nationalist. She succeeded him as empress. Peter died in captivity soon after his overthrow, perhaps with Catherine's approval as part of the coup conspiracy. However, another theory is that his death was unplanned, resulting from a drunken brawl with one of his guards.

Despite his generally poor reputation, Peter made some progressive reforms during his short reign. He proclaimed religious freedom and encouraged education, sought to modernize the Russian army, abolished the secret police, which had been infamous for its extreme violence, and made it illegal for landowners to kill their serfs without going to court. Catherine reversed some of his reforms and carried through others, notably the annexation of church property.

Early life

Peter was born in Kiel, in the duchy of Holstein-Gottorp. His parents were Charles Frederick, Duke of Holstein-Gottorp, and Grand Duchess Anna Petrovna of Russia. Charles Frederick was a grandson of Charles XI of Sweden, and Anna was a daughter of the Russian monarchs Peter the Great and Catherine I. Peter's mother died shortly after his birth. In 1739, Peter's father died, and he became Duke of Holstein-Gottorp as Charles Peter Ulrich at the age of 11.

When Peter's aunt Elizabeth became Empress of Russia, she brought Peter from Germany to Russia and proclaimed him her heir presumptive in the autumn of 1742. Previously in 1742, the 14-year-old Peter was proclaimed King of Finland during the Russo-Swedish War (1741–1743), when Russian troops held Finland. This proclamation was based on his succession rights to territories held by his childless great-uncle, the late Charles XII of Sweden, who also had been Grand Duke of Finland. About the same time, in October 1742, he was chosen by the Swedish parliament to become heir presumptive to the Swedish throne. However, the Swedish parliament was unaware of the fact that he had also been proclaimed heir presumptive to the throne of Russia, and when their envoy arrived in Saint Petersburg in November, it was too late. It has been reported that the underage Peter's succession rights to Sweden were renounced on his behalf. Also in November, Peter converted to Eastern Orthodoxy under the name of Pyotr Feodorovich, and was created Grand Duke of Russia. The words "Grandson of Peter the Great" were made an obligatory part of his official title, underscoring his dynastic claim to the Russian throne, and it was made a criminal offence to omit them.

Empress Elizabeth arranged for Peter to marry his second cousin, Sophia Augusta Frederica (later Catherine the Great), daughter of Christian August, Prince of Anhalt-Zerbst, and Princess Joanna Elisabeth of Holstein-Gottorp. Sophia formally converted to Russian Orthodoxy and took the name Ekaterina Alexeievna (i.e., Catherine). They married on 21 August 1745. The marriage was not a happy one but produced one son, the future Emperor Paul I, and one daughter, Anna Petrovna (1757–1759). Catherine later claimed that Paul was not fathered by Peter; that, in fact, they had never consummated the marriage. During the sixteen years of their residence in Oranienbaum, Catherine took numerous lovers, while her husband did the same in the beginning.

Character 

The classical view of Peter's character is mainly drawn out of the memoirs of his wife and successor. She described him as an "idiot" and as a "drunkard from Holstein", also describing her marriage with him with "there is nothing worse than having a child-husband"; even Peter's idol, Frederick the Great mentioned of him by saying "he allowed himself to be dethroned like a child sent off to bed".

This portrait of Peter can be found in most history books, including the 1911 Encyclopædia Britannica:

There have been many attempts to revise the traditional characterization of Peter and his policies. The Russian historian A. S. Mylnikov views Peter III very differently:

The German historian Elena Palmer goes even further, portraying Peter III as a cultured, open-minded emperor who tried to introduce various courageous, even democratic reforms in 18th-century Russia. A monument for Peter III stands in Kiel (North Germany), the city of his birth.

Reign

Foreign policy
After Peter succeeded to the Russian throne, he withdrew Russian forces from the Seven Years' War and concluded a peace treaty with Prussia (dubbed the "Second Miracle of the House of Brandenburg"). He gave up Russian conquests in Prussia and offered 12,000 troops to make an alliance with Frederick II of Prussia. Russia thus switched from an enemy of Prussia to an ally—Russian troops withdrew from Berlin and marched against the Austrians. This dramatically shifted the balance of power in Europe, suddenly handing the delighted Frederick the initiative. Frederick recaptured southern Silesia (October 1762) and subsequently forced Austria to the negotiating table.

As Duke of Holstein-Gottorp, Peter planned war against Denmark in order to restore parts of Schleswig to his Duchy. He focused on making alliances with Sweden and with England to ensure that they would not interfere on Denmark's behalf, while Russian forces gathered at Kolberg in Russian-occupied Pomerania. Alarmed at the Russian troops concentrating near their borders, unable to find any allies to resist Russian aggression, and short of money to fund a war, the government of Denmark threatened in late June to invade the free city of Hamburg in northern Germany to force a loan from it. Peter considered this a casus belli and prepared for open warfare against Denmark.

In June 1762, 40,000 Russian troops assembled in Pomerania under General Pyotr Rumyantsev, preparing to face 27,000 Danish troops under the French general Count St. Germain in case the Russian–Danish freedom conference (scheduled for 1 July 1762 in Berlin under the patronage of Frederick II) failed to resolve the issue. However, shortly before the conference, Peter lost his throne and the conference did not occur. The issue of Schleswig remained unresolved. Peter was accused of planning an unpatriotic war.

While historically Peter's planned war against Denmark was seen as a political failure, recent scholarship has portrayed it as part of a pragmatic plan to secure his Holstein-Gottorp duchy and to expand the common Holstein-Russian power northward and westwards. Peter believed gaining territory and influence in Denmark and Northern Germany was more useful to Russia than taking East Prussia. Equally, he thought that friendship with Prussia and with Britain, following its triumph in the Seven Years War, could offer more to aid his plans than alliance with either Austria or France.

Domestic reforms

During his 186-day period of government, Peter III passed 220 new laws that he had developed and elaborated during his life as a crown prince. Elena Palmer claims that his reforms were of a democratic nature; he also proclaimed religious freedom.

Peter III's economic policy reflected the rising influence of Western capitalism and the merchant class or "Third Estate" that accompanied it. He established the first state bank in Russia, rejected the nobility's monopoly on trade and encouraged mercantilism by increasing grain exports and forbidding the import of sugar and other materials that could be found in Russia.

Overthrow and death

Peter tried to escape by taking a boat to the military base of Kronstadt on the island of Kotlin, hoping that the fleet remained loyal to him. However, the fleet's cannons opened fire on Peter's boat with two or three shots, and he was repulsed back to the shore, with the commandant declaring that he recognized no emperor and that Russia was ruled by empress Catherine. The people of St. Petersburg, drawn to the shore by the loud echoes of cannons, also armed themselves with sticks and stones to prevent him from returning to the capital city.

Shortly thereafter, he was transported to Ropsha, where he later died. Much mystery surrounds his death. The official cause, after an autopsy, was a severe attack of hemorrhoidal colic and an apoplectic stroke, while others say he was assassinated. While others state that after a midday meal, Peter's captors tried to suffocate him by using a mattress but he managed to escape. This then led his captors to strangle him to death with a scarf. Nevertheless, he was later buried on 3 August 1762 [O.S. 23 July] in the Alexander Nevsky Monastery, Saint Petersburg.

Legacy
After his death, four pretenders to the throne, insisting that they were Peter (five if Šćepan Mali of Montenegro is included) came forth, supported by revolts among the people, who believed in a rumor that Peter had not died but had been secretly imprisoned by Catherine. The most famous was the Cossack Yemelyan Pugachev, who led what came to be known as Pugachev's Rebellion in 1774, which was ultimately crushed by Catherine's forces. In addition, Kondratii Selivanov, who led a castrating sect known as the Skoptsy, claimed to be both Jesus and Peter III.

In December 1796, after succeeding Catherine, Peter's son, Emperor Paul I of Russia, who disliked his mother's behavior, arranged for Peter's remains to be exhumed and reburied with full honors in the Peter and Paul Cathedral, where other tsars (Russian emperors) were buried.

Lore
The legend of Peter is still talked about, especially in the town where he lived most of his life, formerly Oranienbaum, later Lomonosov, situated on the southern coast of the Gulf of Finland, 40 km west of St. Petersburg. Peter's palace is the only one of the famous palaces in the St. Petersburg area that was not captured by the Germans during the Second World War. During the war, the building was a school and people say the ghost of Peter protected the children of Oranienbaum from getting hurt by bombs. Furthermore, it was near this town that the siege of Leningrad ended in January 1944. People say that Peter, after his death, stopped Hitler's army near Leningrad, just as the living Peter had ordered the Russian army to stop, just as it was about to capture the Prussian capital of Konigsberg.

Cultural references

Peter has been depicted on screen a number of times, almost always in films concerning his wife Catherine. He was portrayed by Rudolf Klein-Rogge in the 1927 film The Loves of Casanova, Douglas Fairbanks Jr. in the 1934 film The Rise of Catherine the Great and by Sam Jaffe in The Scarlet Empress the same year. In 1991 Reece Dinsdale portrayed him in the television series Young Catherine. La Tempesta (1958) depicts Yemelyan Pugachev's effort to force his recognition as Peter III and offers a critical view of Catherine the Great, with Van Heflin in the role of Pugachev and Viveca Lindfors as Catherine. He was also depicted as a cowardly, drunken wife-beater in the Japanese anime Le Chevalier D'Eon. He also appears in the 2014 TV series played by Aleksandr Yatsenko. He was most recently played by Nicholas Hoult in the 2020 Hulu series The Great, also starring Elle Fanning as Catherine.

Ancestry

See also
 Family tree of Russian monarchs

Notes

References

Bibliography

 Bain, R. Nisbet. Peter III, Emperor of Russia: The Story of a Crisis and a Crime. New York: E.P. Dutton & Co., 1902. 
 Dull, Jonathon R. The French Navy and the Seven Years War. University of Nebraska, 2005. 
 Leonard, Carol S. "The Reputation of Peter III." Russian Review 47.3 (1988): 263-292 online.
 Leonard, Carol S. Reform and Regicide: The Reign of Peter III of Russia. Indiana University Press, 1993.
 Pares, Bernard. A History of Russia (1944) pp 240–244. online. 
 Raleigh, Donald J. and Iskenderov, A.A. "The Emperors and Empresses of Russia: Rediscovering the Romanovs". New York: M.E. Sharpe, 1996. 
 .

External links
 
  The ancestors and descendants Pyotr III Fyodorovitch, Emperor of Russia
  Biography of Pyotr III Fyodorovitch
 Tempest at the Internet Movie Database
  – Historical reconstruction "The Romanovs". StarMedia. Babich-Design (Russia, 2013).

 
1728 births
1762 deaths
18th-century Russian monarchs
Nobility from Kiel
1762 murders in Europe
Assassinated heads of state
Burials at Saints Peter and Paul Cathedral, Saint Petersburg
House of Holstein-Gottorp-Romanov
Murdered Russian monarchs
Male murder victims
Eastern Orthodox monarchs
Dukes of Holstein-Gottorp
People from the Duchy of Holstein
Recipients of the Pour le Mérite (military class)
Russian emperors
Converts to Eastern Orthodoxy from Lutheranism
Unsolved murders in the Russian Empire
Russian grand dukes
Catherine the Great
18th-century murdered monarchs
Leaders ousted by a coup
People of the Silesian Wars
Dethroned monarchs
Recipients of the Order of the White Eagle (Poland)
Royal reburials